The Dutch Eredivisie in the 1989–90 season was contested by 18 teams. Ajax won the championship.

League standings

Results

Promotion/Relegation
Starting this season, the number 16 of the Eredivisie would play against relegation against the runners-up of the promotion/relegation play-offs of the Eerste Divisie. The Eerste Divisie league champions and winner of the play-offs would replace the numbers 17 and 18 of this league directly. See here for details of the system.

NEC: remain in Eredivisie 
Emmen: remain in Eerste Divisie

See also
 1989–90 Eerste Divisie
 1989–90 KNVB Cup

References

 Eredivisie official website - info on all seasons 
 RSSSF

Eredivisie seasons
Netherlands
1989–90 in Dutch football